LATTC/Ortho Institute station, officially Los Angeles Trade–Technical College/Orthopaedic Institute for Children station, is an at-grade light rail station on the E Line of the Los Angeles Metro Rail system. The station is located alongside Flower Street between 23rd Street and Adams Boulevard. The station is located near the Los Angeles Trade–Technical College (LATTC) and the Orthopaedic Institute for Children (Ortho Institute), after which the station is named. In addition to the LATTC campus and the Ortho Institute, the station also serves the North University Park neighborhood. The station also has nearby stops for the J Line of the Los Angeles Metro Busway system, southbound buses stop on Flower Street, across from the station at both 23rd Street and Adams Boulevard and northbound buses stop on Figueroa Street, one block to the west.

Service

Station layout

Hours and frequency

Connections 
, the following connections are available:
 LADOT DASH: F, King-East
 Torrance Transit: 4X*
Note: * indicates commuter service that operates only during weekday rush hours.

Notable places nearby 
The station is within walking distance of the following notable places:
 Los Angeles Trade–Technical College
 Mount St. Mary's College  
 Orthopaedic Institute for Children
 St. John's Episcopal Cathedral

Station artwork 
The station's art was created by artist Christofer C. Dierdorff. Entitled The Intimacy of Place, the installation uses photographs of the fronts and backs of the heads of local people, creating intimate portraits that show each individual in the context of her/his role in the community.

References

E Line (Los Angeles Metro) stations
J Line (Los Angeles Metro)
Los Angeles Metro Busway stations
University Park, Los Angeles
Railway stations in the United States opened in 2012
Railway stations in Los Angeles
2012 establishments in California
Railway stations in California at university and college campuses
Bus stations in Los Angeles